The Campeonato da Cidade de Campos (Campos City Championship in English), also known as Campeonato de Campos (Campos Championship in English), Campeonato Campista (Campista Championship in English) and Liga Campista (Campista League in English) was the football league of the city of Campos dos Goytacazes, Rio de Janeiro, Brazil.

From 1914 to 1951, was the amateur era of the competition. In 1952, started the professional era.

The league ended in 1979, because it was suffering the competition of the more popular Campeonato Carioca.

List of champions

1914 Goytacaz
1915 Americano
1917 Rio Branco
1918 Campos
1919 Americano
1920 Goytacaz
1921 Americano
1922 Americano
1923 Americano
1924 Campos
1925 Americano
1926 Goytacaz
1927 there was no champion, and the competition was annulled.
1928 Rio Branco
1929 Rio Branco
1930 Americano
1931 Rio Branco
1932 Campos and Goytacaz¹
1933 Goytacaz
1934 Americano
1935 Americano
1936 Aliança
1937 Aliança
1938 Aliança
1939 Americano
1940 Goytacaz
1941 Goytacaz
1942 Goytacaz
1943 Goytacaz
1944 Americano
1945 Goytacaz
1946 Americano
1947 Americano
1948 Goytacaz
1949 Rio Branco
1950 Americano
1951 Goytacaz
1952 São José
1953 Goytacaz
1954 Americano
1955 Goytacaz
1956 Campos
1957 Goytacaz
1958 Rio Branco
1959 Goytacaz
1960 Goytacaz
1961 Rio Branco
1962 Rio Branco
1963 Goytacaz
1964 Americano
1965 Americano
1966 Goytacaz
1967 Americano
1968 Americano
1969 Americano
1970 Americano
1971 Americano
1972 Americano
1973 Americano
1974 Americano
1975 Americano
1976 Campos
1977 Americano and Goytacaz²
1978 Americano
1979 Americano

¹There were two champions, because there were two different competitions, promoted by two differente leagues.

²Because of the lack of dates to the finals, the league proclaimed the two clubs as champions;.

Titles by team

Americano 27 times
Goytacaz 20 times
Rio Branco 8 times
Campos 5 times
Aliança 3 times
São José 1 time

See also
 Campeonato Fluminense

References

Cidade de Campos
Football leagues in Rio de Janeiro (state)